John Kantakouzenos was a governor of the Thracesian Theme between 1244 and 1249, with the titles of doux and pinkernes. In 1249 he commanded an expedition sent by Emperor John III Vatatzes against the Genoese who had invaded and taken control of Rhodes during the absence of its governor John Gabalas.

Towards the end of his life John Kantakouzenos became a monk, adopting the name Joannikios, and died sometime before 1257.

Donald Nicol provides evidence to support the identification of this John with John Kantakouzenos Komnenos Angelos, who was the husband of Irene Komnene Palaiologina, sister of Michael VIII Palaiologos. Known children of this couple include:
 Theodora, who married (1) George Mouzalon, (2) John Raoul Petraliphas;
 Maria, wife of Constantine Tikh;
 Anna, wife of Nikephoros I Komnenos Doukas;
 Eugenia, wife of Syrgiannes, and was the mother of Syrgiannes Palaiologos; and 
 A possible fifth unnamed daughter, who married Theodore Mouzalon.

References

Sources 
 

John
13th-century Byzantine people
Governors of the Thracesian Theme
Medieval Rhodes
People of the Empire of Nicaea
Pinkernai